ZhuoYan lin; He has a master's degree in International Finance and he was born in Guang Dong province,China in 1964. He currently serves as the permanent standing vice chairman of Council of China’s Foreign Trade, chairman of the Outlet Assets and Equity Exchange, and chairman of China Outlet Association.

He is also the non-executive chairman and non-executive director of Hsin Chong Group Holdings Limited (Hong Kong Stock Exchange: 404). He has been alleged by Anonymous Analytics to be using Hsin Chong as his personal dumping ground for problematic and non-revenue generating development properties at the expense of minority shareholders. Since 2011, Hsin Chong has acquired a number of development properties that were either owned by Mr. Lin or his wife, or can be directly linked to Mr. Lin. Due to these transactions Hsin Chong is now heavily leveraged and is experiencing financial distress.

Experience

Study of mechanical construction 
In the 1980s ZhuoYan Lin rented a crude plant and fit out simple mechanical processing machineries and began to process and produce mechanical equipment spare parts and provide non-standard parts for local enterprises such as sugar factory, mine field, etc. as an individual workshop of semi- mechanization and semi-handmade type. 
In 1983, Mr. ZhuoYan Lin applied for loan support from the bank again, purchased some land to build a workshop, and established Guangdong General Machinery Plant. Mr. ZhuoYan Lin expanded the business scale and business model of the enterprise, from the production of single small mechanical equipment to the multi-directional processing, manufacturing, installation, debugging, service, etc. of heavy machinery.

R & D of Electronics Technology 
In 1990, ZhuoYan Lin realized the development trend of future electronic technology, and invested 200 million RMB to set up Guangdong Zhong Run Hi-tech Development Co., Ltd while establishing Ke Lin Electronic Science and Technology Co., Ltd in Hong Kong, successfully developed the intelligent traffic management system of the world's leading technology at that moment.

Transformation of business group 
In 1992, ZhuoYan Lin integrated his enterprise and built up Zhongrun Group Co.,beginning to develop his enterprise to an integrated group. he helped the products of many famous international enterprises such as Italy SACMI (Sacmi) Company and BRETON (Pericom) Company, ST (Siti) Company, Pedrini Company, Vigoo Company and Simi Company etc. to open their market in China, and finally became the designated agents and distributors in China of the above-mentioned enterprises.
In 1993, Mr. ZhuoYan Lin used the large international supermarket mode for reference, creatively established a large-scale building materials chain supermarkets distributed in the five regions of the country (Northeast, North China, East China, South China, Southwest), set up branch companies or commercial representative offices in Europe, the United States, Canada, Asia-Pacific, Hong Kong and Macao and built up a perfect domestic and international electronic sales network and operating system, becoming a systematic and omni-bearing group company of the newest business model and the largest scale integrated with production, supply, marketing and service, etc. in domestic building materials industry.

March of financial field 
In 1997, ZhuoYan Lin began to enter the financial industry and invested 250 million RMB to establish Zhongrun International Trust and Investment Co., Ltd in Shenzhen together with Guangdong International Trust and Investment Company. Meanwhile, he invested 500 million RMB to set up Zhongrun International Leasing Company Limited in Beijing. In the same year, he established First Financial Group Company Limited and Hong Kong First Finance Limited Company in Hong Kong. Its business covers finance, consulting, trust, discounting, lending, leasing, financial and investment adviser, etc., taking an important step in the development of the combination of production and finance for the group.
In 1997, ZhuoYan Lin allied 28 financial institutions in Hong Kong and purchased Yuan Fang Group, the listed company of main brand and the largest leading enterprise in the building material industry of Hong Kong through restructuring and marketing listing mode. 
In 1999, Zhongrun Group charged by ZhuoYan Lin obtained the approval of People's Bank of China and purchased the largest shareholder’s shareholding of 22.3% of Guangdong Development Bank held by Guangdong Provincial Department of Finance with 1.23 billion RMB and became the first private enterprise stepping into large-scale commercial bank.

Involvement in energy resources 
From 2000, Mr. ZhuoYan Lin involved in energy and environmental protection industries. He established China Energy & Environmental Protection Group Co., Ltd, successively spent 5 billion RMB on the investment in a number of thermal power plants, hydroelectric power plants, sewage treatment works, wind power plants and biomass power plants.
In 2001, Mr. ZhuoYan Lin realized the better development prospect of oil resources market, invested 350 million RMB again to set up China Mining Group Company, and began to be engaged in the development of mineral resources. He successively invested, purchased and developed energy mineral resources and non-ferrous metal mineral resources in many regions such as Inner Mongolia, Shanxi, Xinjiang, Guangxi, Guizhou as well as Australia.

Introduction of the outlet 
In 2003, ZhuoYan Lin spent 400 million RMB in setting up China Infrastructure Industry and Tianfu Holding, to engage in the business of construction, infrastructure, engineering, decoration, commercial property investment etc. and carried out the mode of “developing multiple operations, giving consideration to multiple profits”, which paved the way for the future expansion and development of commercial real estate in the country.
In 2006, Mr. ZhuoYan Lin invested and developed Outlet which had swept the world in China, and set up Outlet (China) Co., Ltd through investment which focused on the research, investment, development and operation management of Outlet industry in Greater China region.

In 2008, Outlet (China) Co., Ltd. completed the strategic layout in seven economic regions such as the North China, South China, East China, Central China, Northeast, Southwest and Northwest with the total investment of over 50 billion RMB.
In 2009, ZhuoYan Lin completed the combination and upgrade of Outlet Modern Service Industrial Zone and Outlet Modern Service Industry Park, creatively put forward the "3 + X" " Balletown " mode, drove and strengthened the business cluster by using Outlet commerce to form the new city center. As the "Balletown" mode could effectively solve the problem with urban and rural population coordinated transpositions, effectively expand domestic demand, provide large number of job opportunities, create a new way of living, and have an obvious social and economic benefits, it got great attention and good graces from the governments of various regions.

Development of pension program 
In 2011, ZhuoYan Lin invested 5 billion RMB in developing endowment and health maintenance project, set up Karrie International Holdings Limited to build a comprehensive healthy ecological leisure endowment industrial park -" Happy Town ", mixed social demands for endowment and health maintenance with the development of the tourism and leisure industries and realized the life goal of “Senior citizens should be taken good care of, given entertainment to enjoy, given some opportunity to learn, and given some chance to work”, which improved the current inadequate development situation of China’s service institution for the aged and explored a patch which can be used for reference to mix the nationwide endowment and health maintenance into tourism and leisure industries.

Investment of aviation yacht 
In 2012, ZhuoYan Lin decided to re-invest 10 billion RMB to participate in the business of cultural industry, leisure, tourism, luxury brand themed hotel development, etc., and successively set up ERAMCE club, airlines, yacht club and luxury theme hotel, etc.

References

1964 births
Businesspeople from Guangdong
Living people